Nice Nature (Japanese: ナイスネイチャ, April 16, 1988 – ) was a Japanese thoroughbred racehorse. From his debut in 1990 to his retirement in 1996, Nice Nature had a record of 41 starts and 7 wins, including 4 major wins. With a long GI racing career and often placing third, Nice Nature gained popularity as the "Bronze Collector". Nice Nature consecutively placed third in the 1991, 1992, and 1993 Arima Kinen. As of April 2021, Nice Nature is the oldest living stallion to have a JRA major win.

Background
Nice Nature was born in 1988 at the Watanabe Ranch in Urakawa, Hokkaido. His sire, Nice Dancer, had six major wins in Canada, and his dam, Urakawa Miyuki, had three wins, including the 1984 open of what would become the Tulip Sho. Nice Nature's to-be owner Toyoshima Masao made a deposit at Watanabe Ranch. According to the owner of the ranch Watanabe Kazuma, Nice Nature was average as a foal, nor did he stand out in the training ranch. However, Watanabe vaguely alluded that he felt that Nice Nature might be just as good as Nice Nice Nice, also out of Nice Dancer and the winner of the 1989 Kisaragi Sho and 1990 Kyōto Kinen. Nice Nature's to-be trainer Matsunaga Yoshiharu quickly embraced the impression of a "good horse", saying that he felt that things were moving in a "good direction" as he looked at Nice Nature's growth.

After reaching the racing age of three years in 1990, Nice Nature transferred to the Rittō Training Center in Rittō, Shiga under Matsunaga. After Nice Nature's older sister suffered a career ending injury, Nice Nature was trained cautiously and debuted relatively late in December.

Racing career 

 Major Racing Wins
 Kokura Kinen (1991)
 Kyoto Shimbun Hai (1991)
 Naruo Kinen (1991)
 Takamatsunomiya Kinen (1994)

Honours

Stud career
Nice Nature's descendants include:

c = colt, f = filly, g= gelding

Popular culture 
Nice Nature was the inspiration for the character of the same name in the franchise Uma Musume Pretty Derby.

Pedigree 

Family No.: F20-c

Inbreeding within 5 generations: None

Retrieved from Nice Nature's profile on JBIS (Japan Bloodstock Information Database)

Nice Nature's dam Urakawa Miyuki passed away in June 2, 2017 at the age of 36, making her the longest lived female thoroughbred in Japan to have been properly documented.

Notes

Citations

References

  
 the book on Amazon
 Note: No authors were listed on Amazon. The authors listed here are taken from the bibliography section of the Japanese Wikipedia and are presumably the authors of sections in the book.

1988 racehorse births
Racehorses bred in Japan
Racehorses trained in Japan